Hellinsia nephogenes is a moth of the family Pterophoridae. It is found on the Galapagos Islands (Floreana, Isabela and Santa Cruz).

Description
The wingspan is 14–17 mm. The antennae are white at the base and dark brown apically. The head is basally beige. The thorax is beige. The forewings are grey, covered with basally beige and apically brown scales and completely white scales near the middle. The hindwings are dark grey, covered with brown scales.

Ecology
The larvae feed on Scalesia affinis.

Life cycle
Adults have been recorded in March, July, August and December. There are probably two generations per year.

References

Moths described in 1926
nephogenes
Pterophoridae of South America
Fauna of Ecuador
Endemic fauna of the Galápagos Islands
Moths of South America